Nefesh or Nephesh may refer to:

 A Hebrew word for soul
 A Semitic monument placed near a grave so as to be seen from afar
 Nefesh (group) A networking organization for Torah-observant mental health professionals
 Nefesh B'Nefesh, an organization that promotes Aliyah